FK ASK Riga was a Latvian football club of the Latvian army, founded in 1923. In the 1920s and 1930s it was one of the leading clubs in Latvia. In 1940s it was disbanded, a new football club of the Soviet army was created in Riga under the name FK AVN, later AVN was renamed to ASK. It became defunct in 1970.

History

Original FK ASK

ASK was founded as a football club with the Latvian army in 1923. In its first year the club earned a promotion to the top Riga division by beating Union Riga. The stadium of ASK (built in 1923) was one of the main football arenas in Riga, Latvia national football team played many matches there.

In 1924 ASK finished second in Riga, but both in 1925 and 1926 it finished last and thus in 1927 it didn't earn a place in the newly founded Virsliga (first league in Latvia to have clubs from both Riga and other cities).  In 1928 ASK earned a promotion to Virsliga by beating LNJS Liepāja.

In 1932 ASK won its first Virsliga title (in a golden match against Riga Vanderer). As at the end of the season both clubs had equal points and it was the first such precedent in the Latvian league and no regulations existed for such situations to determine the champion, at first the position was that both clubs be awarded 1st place in the league, neither of the teams would be considered the "champion" and Rīgas FK as the previous year's winners would retain that title. However a vote in the Latvian Football Union decided that the champion would be decided in a golden match. In the golden match ASK won 3:1 Rehtšprehers, Bredersons and Timpers scored for ASK, Jenihs – for Vanderer. In 1933 ASK won the Riga Football Cup, in the finals they beat Vanderer again.

Through the entire 1930s ASK was always close to the top but it couldn't win another Latvian title as Olimpija Liepāja and Rīgas FK usually came out with more points at the end of the season, that came only during German occupation of Latvia during World War II.

In 1940 ASK together with other popular Latvian football clubs was disbanded by the Soviets but in 1941 it was reformed. In 1942 and 1943 it won the Latvian league, and in 1943 – the Latvian Cup. In 1944 as the Soviet Army entered Riga the club was disbanded again, one of its star players – Aleksandrs Vanags later became popular while playing with RC Strasbourg in France.

FK AVN

In 1945 a new army football club – FK AVN – was created to replace the former ASK. In the early 1950s it was one of the strongest football clubs in Latvia that won the Latvian league in 1950 and 1952 and the Latvian Cup in 1950–1952. Still it was a completely different club than the former ASK as it Soviet soldiers from different Soviet republics played with it. In 1953 the club was disbanded as a part of the process of eliminating army clubs all over the USSR. The most notable footballer of this era of the club was the goalkeeper Valentin Ivakin who only played with AVN for one year (in 1952), however later he played with top Soviet clubs – CSKA Moscow and Spartak Moscow and even made one international appearance for USSR national football team. It was restored just a year later and earned promotion to the top league at the end of the 1954 season. Just one year later it was renamed to ASK Riga.

Soviet FK ASK

FK ASK had a strong dominance in the Latvian league in 1960s as it won the Latvian league 6 years in a row (such a result was surpassed only in the 1990s by Skonto FC). Just like AVN this ASK was a club that didn't rely too much on the local footballers, but at least some Latvians did get a chance to play there and one of them was future Daugava Rīga professional and Latvia national football team coach Jānis Gilis.

The second half of the 1960s wasn't as good for ASK as the first one, and in 1970 it became defunct.

Honours

Latvian top league winners: 11 (1932, 1942, 1943, 1950, 1952, 1960–1965)
Latvian Cup winners: 6 (1943, 1950–1952, 1959, 1960, 1966)

References

ASK
A
A
1923 establishments in Latvia
1970 disestablishments in Latvia